Sealcoating, or pavement sealing, is the process of applying a protective coating to asphalt-based pavements to provide a layer of protection from the elements: water, oils, and U.V. damage. 

The effects of asphalt sealers have been debated. Asphalt sealing is marketed as increasing the life of the asphalt, but there is no independent research that proves these claims. Asphalt sealing can also make the asphalt more slippery and impact the environment.

Detriments to Sealcoat
 
Pavement sealcoat products come in a variety of standards.  For example, refined tar-based sealer offers the best protecting against water penetration and chemical resistance.  Asphalt-based sealer typically offers poor protection against environmental, chemical and harsher climates (salt water).  Petroleum-based sealer offer protection against water and chemicals somewhere between the other two sealers.  Another difference between coatings is in terms of wear.  Again, refined tar-based sealer offers the best wear characteristics (typically 3–5 years) while asphalt-based sealer may last 1–3 years.  Petroleum-based sealer falls between refined tar and asphalt.

There are concerns about pavement sealer polluting the environment after it is abraded from the surface of the pavement.  Some states in North America have banned the use of coal tar–based sealants primarily based on United States Geological Survey studies.

Types
There are primarily five types of pavement sealers. 

These are commonly known as: 

 Refined tar-based (coal tar based)
 Asphalt-based
 Acrylic (Paint)
 Fast Dry
 Oil-based

All five have their advantages and disadvantages, but are typically chosen by the preference unless otherwise specified.

Application methods
Prior to application the surface must be completely clean and dry using sweeping methods and/or blowers.  If the surface is not clean and dry, then poor adhesion will result. Pavement sealers are applied with either pressurized spray equipment, or self-propelled squeegee machines or by hand with a brush. Equipment must have continuous agitation to maintain consistency of the sealcoat mix. The process is typically a two-coat application which requires 24 to 48 hours of curing before vehicles can be allowed back on the surface. Once the surface is properly prepared, then properly mixed sealer will be applied at about 1.5 square meters per liter (60 sq ft per U.S. gal; 72 sq ft per Imp gal) per coat.

Polycyclic aromatic hydrocarbons
Some studies that suggest that refined coal tar sealants are a significant contributor to polycyclic aromatic hydrocarbon levels in streams and creek beds and that the continual application of sealcoats may be a significant factor. As a result, a few municipalities in the United States have banned this material. The same studies also suggest that it can be harmful if ingested before curing and ingesting soil or dust contaminated by eroded coal tar sealant. It is also known to have effects on fish and other animals that live in water.

See also 
 Road surface

References

Pavements
Petroleum products
Asphalt